Cerro San José is a mountain found on the boundary between the Mexican states of Chihuahua and Sonora. The mountain is located in Janos Municipality in Chihuahua, and Bavispe Municipality in Sonora.

Landforms of Chihuahua (state)
Landforms of Sonora
San Jose, Cerro